Club Sportif Municipal Sully-sur-Loire is a French association football club. They are based in the town of Châteaudun and their home stadium is the Stade Lionel Jourdain. As of the 2009–10 season, the club plays in the Division d'Honneur Regionale de Centre, the seventh tier of French football.

External links
Club information at fff.fr 

Sully sur Loire
Sport in Loiret
Sport in Eure-et-Loir
Football clubs in Centre-Val de Loire